This is a list of recognised pioneering expeditions to Greenland that contributed to the cartography of the territory.

See also 
 Geography of Greenland
 Arctic exploration
 List of Arctic expeditions

References

Bibliography
 

History of Greenland
Exploration of the Arctic
Cartography
History of geography
Arctic expeditions
Geography of Greenland
Arctic-related lists